Musaymir is a village in south-western Yemen. It is located in the Abyan Governorate.

History
Formerly Musaymir was the capital of the Haushabi Sultanate.

References

External links
Towns and villages in the Abyan Governorate

Populated places in Abyan Governorate
Villages in Yemen